The Jianwen Emperor (5 December 1377 – ?), personal name Zhu Yunwen, was the second Emperor of the Ming dynasty, reigned from 1398 to 1402. The era name of his reign, "Jianwen", means "establishing civility" and represented a sharp change in tone from Hongwu ("vastly martial"), the era name of the reign of his grandfather and predecessor, the Hongwu Emperor. His reign did not last long: an attempt to restrain his uncles led to the Jingnan rebellion. The Jianwen Emperor was eventually overthrown by one of his uncles, Zhu Di, who was then enthroned as the Yongle Emperor. Although the Yongle Emperor presented a charred body as Zhu Yunwen's, rumours circulated for decades that the Jianwen Emperor had disguised himself as a Buddhist monk and escaped from the palace when it was set on fire by Zhu Di's forces. The History of Ming mentioned that one of the reasons behind why the Yongle Emperor sponsored the admiral Zheng He on his treasure voyages in the early 15th century was for Zheng He to search for the Jianwen Emperor, who was believed to have survived and fled to Southeast Asia. Some historians believe that the Jianwen Emperor had indeed survived and escaped from Nanjing, but the official histories of the Ming dynasty were modified later during the Qing dynasty to please the Manchu rulers.

Early life
Zhu Yunwen's father, Zhu Biao, was the eldest son of Zhu Yuanzhang. He was made crown prince in 1368 after Zhu Yuanzhang founded the Ming dynasty and became known as the Hongwu Emperor. After Zhu Biao died in 1392, the Hongwu Emperor initially considered choosing a successor from among his other sons, who wielded considerable influence in their respective princedoms throughout the Ming Empire. However, after several months of careful deliberation and discussion with his subjects, he decided to uphold the strict rules of primogeniture laid out in his imperial ancestral instructions, and designated Zhu Biao's son, Zhu Yunwen, as the new crown prince.

Reign

Zhu Yunwen succeeded his grandfather upon the latter's death in 1398, and was enthroned as the Jianwen Emperor. One of the first things he did after taking over the reins of power was to rehabilitate and set free the victims (and their families) of the Hongwu Emperor's purges, particularly those who had contributed to the founding the Ming dynasty. Upon the advice of the Confucian scholar-bureaucrats in his government, he continued his grandfather's policy of restraining the court eunuchs and began taking back territory and power from his uncles. Within the year 1399, he demoted or arrested several of his uncles and even caused one of them to commit suicide.

In response to the Jianwen Emperor's crackdown on the influence of imperial princes, Zhu Di (the Prince of Yan and fourth son of the Hongwu Emperor) captured and coöpted the princedom of his 17th brother, Zhu Quan (the Prince of Ning), thereby putting himself in control of the bulk of the Ming army in northern China. He also won the support of several Mongol tribes when he burnt down Daning, the capital of Zhu Quan's princedom, and evacuated Ming forces from the princedom. Later, Zhu Di feigned illness and madness to convince the Jianwen Emperor to release three of his sons, who were being kept as hostages in Nanjing to prevent Zhu Di from rebelling against the emperor. However, the Jianwen Emperor became wary of Zhu Di and tried to arrest him later but failed. Zhu Di then launched the Jingnan Campaign against the Jianwen Emperor.

Fall from power
Aided by eunuch spies and turncoat generals, Zhu Di succeeded in capturing the Ming army's Yangtze fleet and entered the capital Nanjing through an opened gate in 1402. Through propaganda, Zhu Di tried to portray himself as someone like the Duke of Zhou, who supported his nephew, King Cheng of the Zhou dynasty, and waged war against the king's evil advisors. Zhu Di's entrance into Nanjing was almost immediately followed by the burning of the imperial palace and the presentation of three charred bodies identified as the Jianwen Emperor, his consort and his crown prince. The Jianwen era was then declared void and historical records about this era were systematically altered or destroyed. Zhu Di ascended the throne as the Yongle Emperor and established the new imperial capital in Beijing, formerly the capital of his princedom. Thousands of scholars and their families who opposed the Yongle Emperor were executed  the most famous were Fang Xiaoru and three others remembered as the Four Martyrs.

There were rumours that the Jianwen Emperor managed to escape from Nanjing by disguising himself as a Buddhist monk. Some records  reported that one year after he became emperor, the Yongle Emperor sent Zheng He and Hu Ying to search for the Jianwen Emperor. In 1423, Hu returned and reported to the Yongle Emperor about his findings in a private conversation. The Yongle Emperor subsequently promoted Hu.

Some parts of the historical text History of Ming, the authoritative history of the Ming dynasty, mentioned that one of the reasons behind why the Yongle Emperor sponsored the admiral Zheng He's treasure voyages in the early 15th century was that the emperor wanted Zheng He to help him search for the Jianwen Emperor, who was believed to have survived and fled to Southeast Asia. Other records relate that decades later, the Jianwen Emperor returned to the imperial palace and lived the rest of his life in obscure retirement.

The three charred bodies presented to the Yongle Emperor were not given a full burial and there is no known tomb of the Jianwen Emperor. He was initially denied a temple name and left unhonoured in imperial shrines. The Prince of Fu, a self-proclaimed emperor of the Southern Ming, granted the Jianwen Emperor the temple name Huizong in 1644, but this name is not generally remembered or accepted in official Chinese histories. The Yongle Emperor changed many history records about the Jianwen Emperor, but the people still remembered the Jianwen Emperor's kindness during his four-year reign.

Family
Consorts and Issue:
 Empress Xiaominrang, of the Ma clan (1378–1402)
 Zhu Wenkui, Crown Prince Hejian (30 November 1396 – 1402), first son
 Zhu Wengui, Prince of Runhuai (1401–1457), second son

Ancestry

See also
 Chinese emperors family tree (late)
 List of people who disappeared

Notes

References

External links 
 

1377 births
1402 deaths
14th-century Chinese monarchs
15th-century Chinese monarchs
15th-century missing person cases
Ming dynasty emperors
Missing person cases in China
Murdered Chinese emperors
People from Nanjing
Suicides in the Ming dynasty